The Pasley Baronetcy, of Craig in the County of Dumfries, is a title in the Baronetage of Great Britain. It was created on 1 September 1794 for the prominent Scottish naval commander Thomas Pasley, with remainder to the male issue of his daughters. On his death in 1808 he was succeeded according to the special remainder by his grandson Thomas Sabine, who the following year assumed by Royal licence the surname of Pasley in lieu of his patronymic. He was also a distinguished naval commander. The fifth Baronet was a literary scholar. The family surname is pronounced "Paisley".

Pasley baronets, of Craig (1794)
Sir Thomas Pasley, 1st Baronet (1734–1808)
Sir Thomas Sabine Pasley, 2nd Baronet (1804–1884)
Sir Thomas Edward Sabine Pasley, 3rd Baronet (1863–1947)
Sir Rodney Marshall Sabine Pasley, 4th Baronet (1899–1982)
Sir (John) Malcolm Sabine Pasley, 5th Baronet (1926–2004)
Sir Robert Killigrew Sabine Pasley, 6th Baronet (born 1965)

Notes

References
Kidd, Charles, Williamson, David (editors). Debrett's Peerage and Baronetage (1990 edition). New York: St Martin's Press, 1990, 

Pasley
Baronetcies created with special remainders
1794 establishments in Great Britain